The 1973 Chicago White Sox season was the team's 73rd season in the major leagues, and its 74th season overall. They finished with a record of 77–85, good enough for fifth place in the American League West, 17 games behind the first-place Oakland Athletics.

Offseason 
 October 19, 1972: Walt Williams was traded by the White Sox to the Cleveland Indians for Eddie Leon.
 February 1, 1973: Jim Lyttle was traded by the White Sox to the Kansas City Royals for Joe Keough.
 February 7, 1973: Chuck Hartenstein and Glenn Redmon were traded by the White Sox to the San Francisco Giants for Skip Pitlock.

Regular season 
 July 20, 1973: Wilbur Wood became the last pitcher in the 20th century to start both ends of a doubleheader.

Opening Day lineup 
 Pat Kelly, RF
 Carlos May, LF
 Dick Allen, 1B
 Bill Melton, 3B
 Ken Henderson, CF
 Mike Andrews, DH
 Ed Herrmann, C
 Jorge Orta, 2B
 Eddie Leon, SS
 Wilbur Wood, P

Season standings

Record vs. opponents

Notable transactions 
 August 15, 1973: Jim Kaat was selected off waivers by the White Sox from the Minnesota Twins.
 August 29, 1973: Eddie Fisher was purchased by the St. Louis Cardinals from the Chicago White Sox.

Roster

Player stats

Batting 
Note: G = Games played; AB = At bats; R = Runs scored; H = Hits; 2B = Doubles; 3B = Triples; HR = Home runs; RBI = Runs batted in; BB = Base on balls; SO = Strikeouts; AVG = Batting average; SB = Stolen bases

Pitching 
Note: W = Wins; L = Losses; ERA = Earned run average; G = Games pitched; GS = Games started; SV = Saves; IP = Innings pitched; H = Hits allowed; R = Runs allowed; ER = Earned runs allowed; HR = Home runs allowed; BB = Walks allowed; K = Strikeouts

Farm system

Awards and honors 

All-Star Game
 Pat Kelly, reserve

Notes

References 
 1973 Chicago White Sox at Baseball Reference

Chicago White Sox seasons
Chicago White Sox season
Chicago White Sox